Peter Lang (1859 – August 20, 1932) was an American actor. He played in many silent films, including An American Citizen and The Valley of Lost Hope.

Filmography
The Port of Doom (1913)
A Lady of Quality (1913)
An American Citizen (1914)
The Valley of Lost Hope (1915)
The College Widow (1915)
The Great Ruby (1915)
The Evangelist (1916)
The Dawn of Love  (1916)
The Auction Block (1917) 
The Harvest Moon (1920)
Dangerous Money (1924)

References

External links

1859 births
1932 deaths
American male silent film actors
20th-century American male actors